Thomas Renton Elliott  (11 October 1877 – 4 March 1961) was a British physician and physiologist.

Biography
Elliott was born in Willington, County Durham, as the eldest son to retailer Archibald William Elliott and his wife, Anne, daughter of Thomas Renton, of Otley, Yorkshire. He studied natural sciences at Trinity College, Cambridge, specialising in physiology.

He joined University College Hospital as a junior staff member in 1910, and eventually became first professor of medicine and director of the medical unit at Gower Street, London.

Elliot married Martha McCosh in 1918. They lived in Cheyne Walk in Chelsea, London and had three sons and two daughters. One son was judge Archie Elliott, Lord Elliott.

In 1935, Elliott and his wife commissioned the architectural practice of Rowand Anderson, Paul & Partners to build their house Broughton Place in the Scottish Borders. It was designed by Basil Spence, then a partner in the firm, who worked closely with Mrs Elliott to meet her requirements. Work began in 1936 and was completed in 1938.

Elliott retired in 1939 and died at Broughton House in 1961.

Awards and memberships 
 Distinguished Service Order (1918)
 Honorary member of the Association of American Physicians
 Honorary member of the Rome Academy of Medicine
 Gold medal of the West London MedicoChirurgical Society (1920)
 Honorary Fellow of Trinity College, Cambridge (1947)
 Member of the Medical Research Council (1920–1931 and 1939–1943)
 Fellow of the Royal Society
 Old Dunelmian

References

External links
 

1877 births
1961 deaths
People from Willington, County Durham
20th-century English medical doctors
British medical researchers
Fellows of the Royal Society